"You're the One" is a song recorded by R&B group the Emotions released as a single in 1984 on Red Label Records. The single reached No. 34 on the Billboard Hot Soul Songs chart.

Background
You're the One was composed and produced by Billy Osborne and Zane Giles. The song came from the Emotions 1984 studio album Sincerely.

Critical reception
Hugh Wyatt of the New York Daily News wrote "The Emotions are a threesome, but their sound at times resembles a full choir, particularly on such cuts as the title tune and You're the One."

References

1984 songs
1984 singles
The Emotions songs